Stan Jordan (born September 24, 1937) is an American entrepreneur and politician who served as a School Board Member for the Duval County School Board from 1984 to 2000 and then served as a State Representative for the Florida House of Representatives 17th District from 2000 to 2008. He is a member of the Republican Party. Jordan retired from the legislature when his term ended on November 3, 2008 and continued to serve one last term as a School Board Member for the Duval County School Board from 2008 to 2009.

Education and career 
Jordan was born in Jacksonville, and earned his (BA) at Jacksonville University in 1960 and later received his (MA) in 1967.

He is an entrepreneur and was a local official before being elected to the state legislature. Jordan served as the Chairman and as a Board Member of the Duval County School Board from 1984 to 2000 and in the Florida House of Representatives from 2000 to 2008. Upon leaving the state legislature, Jordan was re-elected to the Duval County School Board in 2008 and served for one term.

Military service 

Jordan enlisted in the United States Army as a young man and worked to earn a commission as an officer in the United States Army. After a few years, he was selected to attend Officer Candidate School (OCS) at Fort Benning, GA. Jordan was commissioned as a Second Lieutenant (O1) on 22 May 1961 upon graduating from Officer Candidate School class NR 1-61.

Jordan retired as a Colonel (O6) after 39 years of service in the Armed Forces.

Personal life 
Jordan is the President and CEO of the Sterling Company of Florida  and co-owner of the Beach Diner chain.

References 

Living people
Republican Party members of the Florida House of Representatives
Politicians from Jacksonville, Florida
Jacksonville University alumni
21st-century American politicians
1937 births